Bekzat Seilkhanovich Sattarkhanov (4 April 1980 — 31 December 2000) was a Kazakh boxer who competed in the men's featherweight division (57 kg) at the 2000 Summer Olympics and won the gold medal.

Sattarkhanov died in a car accident in his native Kazakhstan on New Year's Eve 2000.  Two others in the car survived.

Olympic results
2000 won the gold medal at the Sydney Olympics as a Featherweight. Results were:
Round of 32:Defeated Ovidiu Bobirnat of Romania – PTS (11–5)
Round of 16:Defeated Jeffrey Mathebula of South Africa – PTS (16–5)
Quarterfinal:Defeated Ramazan Palyani of Turkey – PTS (12–11)
Semifinal:Defeated  Tahar Tamsamani of Morocco – PTS (22–10)
Final: Defeated Ricardo Juarez of the United States – PTS (22–14)

References

Bibliography
Bekzat [English, Kazakh & Russian Edition], Yeszhan S. Aynabekov & Nesyp Zhunysbayuly, Kazygurt: Almaty 2006, .

1980 births
2000 deaths
Boxers at the 2000 Summer Olympics
Olympic boxers of Kazakhstan
Olympic gold medalists for Kazakhstan
Road incident deaths in Kazakhstan
Olympic medalists in boxing
Kazakhstani male boxers
Medalists at the 2000 Summer Olympics
Featherweight boxers
People from Shymkent
20th-century Kazakhstani people